Waru is a district in Sidoarjo Regency, East Java. The Purabaya bus station is located in this district.

Villages
Waru consists of 17 villages namely:
 Berbek
 Bungurasih
 Janti
 Kedungrejo
 Kepuhkiriman
 Kureksari
 Madaeng
 Ngingas
 Pepelegi
 Tambakoso
 Tambakrejo
 Tambaksawah
 Tambaksumur
 Tropodo
 Wadungasri
 Waru
 Wedoro

References

External links
 
  

Sidoarjo Regency
Districts of East Java